Harit Pradesh is a proposed new state of India comprising the western parts of Uttar Pradesh state. The etymology derives from Harit, meaning Green (which signifies the agricultural prosperity of the region), and Pradesh, meaning state.

The region has some demographic, economic and cultural patterns that are distinct from other parts of Uttar Pradesh, and more closely resemble those of Haryana, Punjab and North Rajasthan areas.

History
In his 1955 critique of the proposed States Reorganisation Act, Thoughts on Linguistic States, B. R. Ambedkar had advocated the division of Uttar Pradesh into three states – Western, Central and Eastern, with capitals at Meerut, Kanpur and Allahabad respectively – in order to prevent excessively large states from dominating politics at the national level. The act was passed in 1956, however, keeping Uttar Pradesh intact as a single state.

Later, socialists like Dr. Ram Manohar Lohia, Jayaprakash Narayan, Acharya Kripalani and others favoured re-drawing of the administrative map of India. But, Jawaharlal Nehru, the then prime minister, supported the States Reorganisation Commission (SRC) recommendation of re-forming states on linguistic basis. Dr K.M. Panikkar, in his dissenting note to the SRC report, however, opposed linguistic states and favoured formation of a state of west Uttar Pradesh.

Later, in 1972, fourteen MLAs in the Uttar Pradesh state assembly moved an unsuccessful resolution to divide the state into three units (Braj Pradesh, Awadh Pradesh and Purvi Pradesh).

During the 1975–77 Emergency, Sanjay Gandhi almost succeeded in carving out a new state of western Uttar Pradesh with Agra as capital. The new state was to include parts of Haryana too.
BSP-led UP government had on 23 November 2011, passed a resolution in the state assembly for creating Purvanchal, Bundelkhand, Awadh Pradesh and Pashchim Pradesh out of UP. The resolution was forwarded to the UPA government at the Centre but no action was taken.
After, Congress working committee passed a resolution to recommend formation of a new state of Telangana on 31 July 2013, demand for Harit Pradesh gained momentum. Sh. Jairam Ramesh suggested that UP's reorganisation was necessary as it is difficult to run such a big state effectively. "Purely from an administrative point of view, a state of over 200 million people, 75 districts, over 800 blocks...It's just not governable. It is my personal view...Its politics is a separate issue," he said.

Geography

Soil conditions
Western Uttar Pradesh's soil and relief has marked differences from that of the eastern part of the state. The soil tends to be lighter-textured loam, with some occurrences of sandy soil. Some loess soil is continuously deposited by winds blowing eastwards from Rajasthan's Thar Desert.

Precipitation

Harit Pradesh receives rain through the Indian Monsoon and the Western Disturbances. The Monsoon carries moisture northwards from the Indian Ocean, occurs in late summer and is important to the Kharif or autumn harvest. Western Disturbances, on the other hand, are an extratropical weather phenomenon that carry moisture eastwards from the Mediterranean Sea, the Caspian Sea and the Atlantic Ocean. They primarily occur during the winter season and are critically important for the main staple of the region, wheat, which is part of the Rabi or spring harvest.

The proposed state contains Upper Ganga and Yamuna Doab region which is considered one of the most fertile lands in the country. River Yamuna forms a natural border between Harit Pradesh and Haryana.

Administrative divisions

Western Uttar Pradesh includes 22 districts in six divisions:

 Saharanpur division: Saharanpur, Muzaffarnagar, Shamli districts.
 Moradabad division: Moradabad, Bijnor, Rampur, Amroha, Sambhal districts.
 Bareilly division: Bareilly, Badaun, Pilibhit districts.
 Meerut division: Meerut, Bulandshahr, Gautam Buddha Nagar, Ghaziabad, Hapur, Baghpat districts.
 Aligarh division: Aligarh, Hathras districts.
 Agra division: Agra, Mainpuri, Firozabad, Mathura districts

Education
The proposed Harit Pradesh has a long tradition of education, although historically it was primarily confined to the elite class and religious schools. Sanskrit-based learning formed the major part of education from the Vedic to the Gupta periods. As cultures traveled through the region they brought their bodies of knowledge with them, adding Pali, Persian, and Arabic scholarship to the community. These formed the core of Hindu-Buddhist-Muslim education until the rise of British colonialism. The present schools-to-university system of education owes its inception and development in the state (as in the rest of the country) to foreign Christian missionaries and the British colonial administration. Schools in the state are either managed by the government or by private trusts. Hindi is used as a medium of instruction in most of the schools except those affiliated to the CBSE or the Council for ICSE boards. Under the 10+2+3 plan, after completing secondary school, students typically enroll for 2 years in a junior college, also known as pre-university, or in schools with a higher secondary facility affiliated with the Uttar Pradesh Board of High School and Intermediate Education or a central board. Students choose from one of three streams, namely liberal arts, commerce, or science. Upon completing the required coursework, students may enroll in general or professional degree programs.

Research institutions
Centre for Development of Advanced Computing, Noida

Special Economic Zones
 Noida
 Greater Noida
 Saharanpur 
 Moradabad
 Bulandshahr
 Bareilly

Transport networks
The region is a hub of excellent highways, freeways, expressways and touristways. There are further developments going on in these fields.
Major State and National highways passing through the proposed Harit Pradesh are:
DND Flyway
Noida Greater Noida Expressway
Yamuna Expressway- Greater Noida to Agra
 Yamnotri Expressway SH-57 [North Delhi-Baghpat-Baraut-Shamli-Saharanpur-Behat-Herbertpur-Vikasnagar-Kalsi-Purola-Harsil-Yamunotri]
NH-58 [Ghaziabad-Meerut-Muzaffarnagar-Roorkee-Haridwar-Rishikesh-Badrinath]
NH-24 New Delhi-Lucknow
NH 709 A Meerut- Karnal Shamli Expressway
Moradabad-Bareilly Expressway AH 02 also NH 530
NH-2 New Delhi-Mathura-Agra and 
NH-91 The Bulandshahr-Aligarh-Kanpur connects Delhi with major cities of the region.

The major highways running through intrastate region include
NH 87, Rampur-Rudrapur-Pantnagar-Haldwani-Nainital-Ranikhet Highway
NH 73,  Roorkee-Saharanpur-Yamunanagar-Saha-Panchkula Highway
NH 74, Haridwar-Najibabad-Dhampur-Afzalgarh-Jaspur-Kashipur-Rudrapur-Kichha-Pilibhit-Khatima-Tanakpur Highway
NH 3 The Agra-Gwalior-Indore-Dhule-Nashik-Mumbai Highway
NH 11,  The Agra-Jaipur Touristway
NH 93, The Internal Highway to Farrukhabad

Upper Ganga Canal Expressway
The Upper Ganga Canal Expressway is an eight-lane controlled-access expressway proposed for the right bank of upper Ganga canal from Sanauta bridge (Bulandshahr district) to near Purkazi (Muzaffarnagar district) near the Uttar Pradesh–Uttarakhand border.

Delhi–Meerut Expressway
The Delhi–Meerut Expressway is a  controlled-access expressway, India's widest at 14 lanes, that connects Delhi to Meerut, via Dasna in Ghaziabad district. An old, 8-lane stretch of NH 24, up to UP Gate, was widened to 14 lanes; the road between UP Gate and Dasana will be also 14 lanes. This the smartest expressway in India.

Moradabad-Bareilly Expressway
This was built for fast track movement of the vehicles between Lucknow,Nainital and Delhi.

Languages
The major languages spoken are Standard Hindi, Urdu, Punjabi, and English. However major dialects of Hindi are spoken in different parts of the state with few sub-dialects also being spoken here. It can be classified according to their divisions -
 Saharanpur Division - Puadhi Punjabi and Gujari are spoken in Saharanpur along with the combination of Haryanvi-Khariboli in Muzaffarnagar and Shamli.
 Meerut Division - Gujari, Haryanvi-Standard Khariboli in Baghpat, Meerut, Ghaziabad, Noida, and Bulandshahr.
 Moradabad Division - Standard Khariboli-Gujari in Amroha and Moradabad, Garhwali and Khariboli in Bijnor, Rohailkhandi Khariboli in Sambhal and Rampur.
 Bareilly Division - Rohailkhandi Khariboli and Kumaoni in Bareilly and Khariboli in Badaun.Few regions in Pilibhit speak Khariboli.
 Aligarh Division - Khariboli-Brajbhasha in Aligarh, Braj Bhasha in Hathras.
 Agra Division - Agra and Mathura speak mainly Braj Bhasha-Haryanvi and few speak Khariboli and Hindi.

Demographics

As per the Census 2011 data, total population of the proposed state is 71,740,055.

The population of Western Uttar Pradesh is composed of a varied set of communities and tribes, including Brahmins - 12%, Jats – 20 to 25%, Rajputs – 8%, Yadav/Ahir – 6%, Gujjars – 9%, Lodhi – 5%, Saini  – 5%, Dalits – 17%, Kayastha – 1.2%, Kurmis – 2%, Kashyap/ Baghel – 4%, Baniya – 2%, Rohilla Pashtuns – 6%, Muslim Rajput - 6%, Ranghar/Jojha – 5%, Rayeen – 4%, Muley Jats/Muslim Jats – 3%, Gaur Muslims/Muslim Tyagis – 1%, Jat Sikh - 0.4%.

The region's Rohillas are descended from immigrant groups from centuries ago, and a large subregion of Western Uttar Pradesh, Rohilkhand, takes its name from that Pashtun tribe.

Sikhs from West Punjab, who migrated from Pakistan after partition, also settled in this area in large numbers.

Role of specific rural communities
In recent decades, which has a large population and spread in Uttar Pradesh. Jats, who are a dominant agricultural community spread across Pakistan, Punjab, Haryana, Rajasthan and Uttar Pradesh, have found themselves in a "politically disadvantageous position" in Western Uttar Pradesh. A separate Harit Pradesh would likely become a prosperous smaller state similar to Haryana and Punjab.

The most prominent current-day advocate for the creation of the new state is Ajit Singh, the leader of the Rashtriya Lok Dal party and a Jat besides many Gurjar leaders. Pushpendra Singh, former General Secretary of Youth wing of Rashtriya Lok Dal, has also recently launched a political party by the name Harit Pradesh Party for the agenda of creating a separate State of Western UP. Other Jat leaders, such as Om Prakash Chautala of neighboring Haryana state and the leader of the Indian National Lok Dal have also made efforts to involve themselves in the politics of creating a separate state. Since the Muslim population in Western Uttar Pradesh (25%–34%, according to various sources) is higher than in Uttar Pradesh as a whole (17%), the Harit Pradesh proposal has found support from Muslim-affiliated organizations. Of the other main political forces in Uttar Pradesh, the Bahujan Samaj Party has supported the demand in principle, the Samajwadi Party has opposed it, and the Indian National Congress and the Bharatiya Janata Party have adopted a non-committal stance. From the Bahujan Samaj Party, Mayawati have been vocal about their support.

Rashtriya Lok Dal alleges that "Western UP contributes to a large chunk – nearly 72% – of the state's total income. In turn, what western UP gets is not enough. Just 18% of the state's budget is spent on developing west UP. This anomaly, understandably, makes the people of this area dissatisfied". There are allegations that in most years, funds allocated to west UP were never spent. According to Dal, only 18% of the state's budget is spent on developing west UP.

The creation of three new states in 2000 (Jharkhand from the division of Bihar, Uttarakhand from the division of Uttar Pradesh and Chhattisgarh from the division of Madhya Pradesh) gave new impetus to the demand for Harit Pradesh.

After coming to power in 2007, in the Bahujan Samaj Party government, Chief Minister Mayawati wrote letters to the prime minister regarding the partitioning of Uttar Pradesh into four different states, in 2007, March 2008, and December 2009. Finally on 15 November 2011, Mayawati's cabinet approved partitioning Uttar Pradesh into four different states (Harit Pradesh, Awadh Pradesh, Bundelkhand and Purvanchal) for better administration and governance.

Notable people

Politics
Atal Bihari Vajpayee
Chaudhary Charan Singh
Kalyan Singh
Mayawati
Sanjeev Balyan
Santosh Gangwar
Ajit Singh
Mahesh Sharma
Shrikant Sharma
Satya Pal Malik
Robert Vadra
Kumar Vishwas
Manish Sisodia
K.C. Tyagi
Mahavir Tyagi
Freedom fighters and kings
Mahendra Pratap
Dhan Singh Gurjar
Kadam Singh
Sah Mal
Begum Samru
Raza Ali Khan

Spiritual leaders
Swami Kalyandev
Bharat Bhushan
Swami Swarupanand
Bhai Dharam Singh

Entrepreneurs
Sumit Jain

Entertainment and media
Kamleshwar Prasad Saxena
Priyanka Chopra
Sonu Nigam
Nawazuddin Siddiqui
Boney Kapoor
Chitrangda Singh
Disha Patani
Vishal Bharadwaj
Kailash Kher
Mandakini
Sushant Singh
Mahima Chaudhry
Rati Agnihotri
Lara Dutta
Zohra Sehgal
Raza Murad
Bharat Bhushan

Sports
Nishu Kumar
Suresh Raina
Piyush Chawla
Bhuvneshwar Kumar
Rahul Chaudhari
Sumit Rathi
Praveen Kumar
Seema Punia
Nitin Tomar
Chandro Tomar
Prakashi Tomar
Saurabh Chaudhary
Annu Rani
Poonam Yadav
Deepak Chahar
Armed forces
Major Asaram Tyagi
Shashindra Pal Tyagi
Rakesh Kumar Singh Bhadauria

See also
Delhi
Haryana
Rajasthan
Uttar Pradesh
Uttarakhand
Western Uttar Pradesh

References

External links 
 
 Tribune India
 South Asia Anal 

Politics of Uttar Pradesh
Proposed states and union territories of India